Romario Florin Moise (born 21 September 1996) is a Romanian professional footballer who plays as an attacking midfielder.

Personal life
His name is Romario because his father, who is named Beckenbauer after the German International footballer Franz Beckenbauer, was a fan of Brazil's 1994 World Cup winning team and his favorite player from that team was Romário. He has a younger brother who also plays football and his name is Antonio after Italian International footballer Antonio Conte.

Career statistics

Club

Honours
Astra Giurgiu
Liga I: 2015–16

UTA Arad
Liga II: 2019–20

References

External links

1995 births
Living people
Sportspeople from Ploiești
Romanian footballers
Association football midfielders
Liga I players
Liga II players
FC Astra Giurgiu players
FC UTA Arad players
FC Petrolul Ploiești players
FC Rapid București players